Bathypyura is a genus of ascidian tunicates in the family Pyuridae.

Species within the genus Bathypyura include:
 Bathypyura asymetrica Monniot, 1971 
 Bathypyura celata Monniot C. & Monniot F., 1973

References

Stolidobranchia
Tunicate genera